Avdeyev or Avdeyeva (feminine) is a common Russian last name that is derived from the male given name Avdey and literally means Avdey's.

It may refer to:

People 
Aleksandr Avdeyev (pilot) (1917–1942), Soviet fighter ace of World War II
Aleksandr Avdeyev (politician) (born 1946), Russian politician and diplomat
Aleksandr Avdeyev (canoeist) (born 1956), Soviet sprint canoer
Aleksey Avdeyev (architect) (1819–1885), Russian architect
Anna Avdeyeva (born 1985), Russian shot putter
Igor Avdeyev (born 1973), Kazakhstani footballer
Sergei Avdeyev (born 1956), Russian cosmonaut
Yulianna Avdeeva (born 1985), Russian classical pianist

Places 
Avdeyeva (village), a village in Kursk Oblast, Russia

References
 

Russian-language surnames